António Pinho Vargas (born Vila Nova de Gaia, August 15, 1951) is a Portuguese composer and pianist specializing in  jazz and contemporary music. He has also written books, essays, and articles on music.

Career
Having obtained a degree in history at the University of Porto, he studied music at the Rotterdam Conservatory from 1987 to 1990 and graduated with a degree in Musical Composition. In 1991, he began teaching musical composition at the Escola Superior de Música in Lisbon. His first jazz album was Outros Lugares (1983). He also wrote soundtracks for Portuguese films and theatrical plays.

Since his return from the Netherlands he has mainly been a classical composer, having written operas, orchestral and ensemble pieces, and works recorded by the Arditti Quartet, Galliard Ensemble, Royal Scottish Academy Brass, and the Northern Sinfonia.

 1983  Outros Lugares
 1985  Cores e Aromas
 1987  As Folhas Novas Mudam de Cor
 1989  Os Jogos do Mundo
 1991  Selos e borboletas
 1995  Monodia
 1996  A Luz e a Escuridão
 2001  Versos
 2003  Os Dias Levantados
 2008  Solo
 2009  Solo II
 2011  Concerto No IST  Improvisações
 2014  Step by Step, Drumming GP plays António Pinho Vargas
 2014  Outro Fim
 2014  Requiem & Judas

List of works

Ensemble
SIX PORTRAITS OF PAIN (2005)
for Violoncello and Large Ensemble
alto fl, ob, cl, bcl, fg, tp, cor, tbn, 3 perc., pf, Cello Solo,
6 vln, 2 vla, 2 vlc, 2 cb;
Duration: 27'
Commissioned by: Casa da Música / Porto 2001
First Performance: Anssi Karttunen (violoncello) and Remix Ensemble, dir: Frank Ollu, Porto, 2005
| critic |

MACHINES FICTIVES (pour Pierrot le fou) (2003) (withdrawn for rev.)
for Ensemble  
fl; ob; cl; bcl, fg; 2 perc; pf; vl I; vl II; vla; vlc; cb;
Duration: 12 '
Commissioned by: Fundação Oriente
First Performance: OchestrUtópica, dir. Yu- Feng, Lisboa, 2003

TRÊS VERSOS DE CAEIRO (1997)
for 12 instruments
fl; ob; cl, cor; fg;; pf; perc; vln I ; vl II; vla; vlc; cb
Duration: 10'
Commissioned by: Foundation Calouste Gulbenkian
First Performance: Ensemble Nuova Sincronia, dir. Renato Rivolta, Lisboa and Milano, 1997
| record |

TRÊS QUADROS PARA ALMADA (1994)
for 10 instruments
fl, cl1, cl/clb, fg/cfg, tp, cr, tbn, pf, vln, vlc,
Duration: 17'
Commissioned by: Professional School of Music – Almada
First Performance: Soloists from Orq. Sinfónica Portuguesa, Lisboa
| record |

ESTUDO/FIGURA (1990)
for 10 instruments
fl; cl; c.i.clb; vib/mar; cel/pf vln I vla; vlc; cb
Duration: 12'
Commissioned by:
First Performance: Performance: Ensemble RC, dir. Arie Van Beck, Amsterdam

MÚSICA PLANA / MÚSICA CONTRAPLANA (1989)
for Opus Ensemble  (withdrawn)
ob/c.i.,vla, cb, pf.
Duration: 12'
Commissioned by: RTP
First Performance: Soloists from Rotterdam's Conservatorium, Amsterdam
(withdrawn for rev.)

Orchestra

CONCERTO para VIOLINO in memorian Gareguin Aroutiounian 
for Violino and Orquestra
Commissioned by CCN
First Performance February 2016, Tamila Kharambura, violin, Orquestra Metropolitana de Lisboa dir. Gary Walker

QUADROS (de arte moderna) 
para Orquestra
Commissioned by Orquestra Clássica do Sul
First Performance July–August 2014

OUVERTURES AND CLOSURES (2012)for orchestra
(2.2.2.2–4.2.2.1-Timp. 1/2 perc .hp.- 8.8.6.6.5.)
Duration:12'
Commissioned by: Guimarães Capital Europeia da Cultura.
First Performance: Orq. Estúdio Guimarães, dir. Rui Massena, Outubro2012, Auditório do CC Vila Flor.

ONZE CARTAS (2011)
for Orchestra, 3 narrators prerecorded and electronics
Commissioned by Casa da Música, Centro Cultural de Belém e Teatro de São Carlos, for the composer's 60 birthday
First Performance: OS CdM, dir. Christopher Konig, 1-10- 11,
Second performance: OSP, dir. Diego Masson, 17 – 1 -12,

AN IMPOSSIBLE TASK (2009)
for orchestra
(Strings 3 vlns 2 vlas, 3 vlc, 1cb e harpsichord)
Duration: 12 '
Commissioned by: Centro Cultural de Belém
First Performance: Orq. Metropolitana de Lisboa, dir. MICHAEL ZILM, 
Abril 2009
Grande Auditório do CCB

UM DISCURSO DE THOMAS BERNHARD (2009)	
for speaker and orchestra
(2.2.2.2- 2.2.2.-1 perc, .hp.-6.6.4.4.2)
Duration: 12 '
Commissioned by: Orquestra Metropolitana de Lisboa
First Performance: Orq. Sinfónica Portuguesa, dir. MICHAEL ZILM, 
Dezembro 2007
Pequeno Auditório do CCB

GRAFFITI [just forms] (2006)
for large orchestra
(3.3.3.1.3.1- 6.3.3.1–5 perc. pf.hp.-16.14.12.10.8)
Duration: 25 '
Commissioned by: Teatro Nacional de São Carlos
First Performance: Orq. Sinfónica Portuguesa, dir. LOTHAR KÖNIGS, Março
2006, Grande Auditório do CCB
| critic |

REENTERING (2004)
for orchestra and percussion obligato
(2.2.2.2. – 0.2.0.2. -1perc) (10.8.6.5.4)
Duration: 8 '
Commissioned by: Teatro Nacional de S. Carlos
First Performance: Orq. Sinfónica Portuguesa dir. Donato Renzentti, Lisboa, 2004
| opinion |

... VON FREMDEN LÄNDLER ... (2004) (withdrawn for rev.)
for piano solo and orchestra
(2.2.2.2 – 4.2.0.0. – 2 perc- 14.12.10.6.5)
Duration: 18 '
Commissioned by: International Music Festival of Coimbra
First Performance: Orq. Gulbenkian, dir. Yu Feng; piano: Anne Kaasa, Coimbra, 2004
(withdrawn for rev.)

DUAS PEÇAS (1992–2000)
for string orchestra
(8.6.6.6.5)
Duration: 15'
Commissioned by:
First Performance: Orq. Nacional do Porto, dir. Cesário Costa, V.N. Gaia

A IMPACIÊNCIA DE MAHLER (1999)
for orchestra
(2.2.2.2 – 4.2.0.0. 1 perc); (14.12.10.6.5)
Duration: 20 '
Commissioned by: Foundation Calouste Gulbenkian
First Performance: Orq. Gulbenkian, dir. Michael Zilm, Lisboa, 2001

ACTING-OUT (1998–2000)
for piano, percussion and orchestra
(2. 2. 2. 1. 2 – 2. 2. 2. 2. 1. 2 perc); strings A (6.6.4.4.3); strings B (6.6.4.4.3)
Duration: 19 '
Commissioned by: Teatro Nacional de São Carlos
http://www.mic.pt/
First Performance: Orq. Sinfónica Portuguesa, dir. António Saiote.
Piano: Miguel Henriques, Percussion: Elizabeth Davies, Lisboa, 1998
| critic |

EXPLICIT DRAMA (1992) (withdrawn for rev.)
for orchestra and jazz trio
Duration: 20 '
Commissioned by: Comissão Portuguesa dos Descobrimentos
First Performance: Orq. Gulbenkian, dir. Michel Swiertchevisky, Lisboa.

GEOMETRAL (1988–2000) (withdrawn for rev.)
for Orchestra (27 instruments)
Duration: 20 '
Commissioned by: Foundation Calouste Gulbenkian
First Performance: Orq. Gulbenkian, dir. Michel Tabachnik, Lisboa, 1989

Chamber music

NO ART II (2013)
for string quartet and piano
Duration: 9'
Commissioned by: Síntese, GMCG
First Performance: (14-11-2013)

QUATRO NOVOS FRAGMENTOS (2012)
version for flute and piano
Duration: 9'
Commissioned by: Luís Meireles 2010
First Performance: (5-1-2013)

STRING QUARTET Nº 3 (2011)
for String Quartet
Commissioned by Instituto Superior Técnico de Lisboa
First performance: Quarteto de Cordas de Matosinhos at IST, July 2012

QUASI UNA SONATA  (2011)
for violin and piano
Duration: 10'
Commissioned by: Centro Cultural de Belém
First Performance: 29-5-2011

QUATRO NOVOS FRAGMENTOS (2010)
for clarinet and piano
Duration: 9'
Commissioned by: António Saiote 2010
First Performance: (2012)

ONE MINUTE TO GO (2010)
for Sond'art Ensemble (fl, cl, ln, vlc, pno)
Duration: 1'
Commissioned by: para os 25 anos do MisoMusic Portugal – 2010
First Performance: 14 April 2010, Instituto Franco-Português

MOVIMENTOS DO SUBSOLO, QUARTETO DE CORDAS Nº 2 (2008)
for String Quartet
Duration: 11'
Commissioned by: XXX Festival Internacional de Música da Povoa de Varzim
First Performance: Quarteto Verazin, Póvoa de Varzim, 2008

DOIS VIOLINOS FOR CARLOS PAREDES (2003)
for 2 violins
(2.2.2.2. – 0.2.0.2. -1perc) (10.8.6.5.4)
Duration: 6 '
Commissioned by: Movimentos Perpétuos
First Performance: Aníbal Lima e Pedro Pacheco, Lisboa, 2003
| record |

STEP BY STEP, WOLFS! (2002)
for 6 percussionists
(2.2.2.2. – 0.2.0.2. -1perc) (10.8.6.5.4)
Duration: 6 '
Commissioned by: Drumming
First Performance: Drumming, dir. Miguel Bernat, 2002
| critic |

TRÊS ESTUDOS FOR 2 PIANOS (2000–2001)
for 2 pianos
Duration: 15 '
Commissioned by:
First Performance: Miguel Henriques, Ana Valente, Lisboa, 2001
| critic |

TWO FAMILY DISCUSSIONS (2001)
for 2 trumpets or 2 recorders
Duration: 6 '
Commissioned by: International Music Festival of Mafra
First Performance: John Wallace, John Miller, Mafra, 2001
| record | | critic |

QUATRO OU CINCO MOVIMENTOS FUGIDIOS DA ÁGUA (2001)
for clarinet trio
Duration: 15 '
Commissioned by:
First Performance: Cl: António Saiote, Vlc: Jed Barahal, Pf: António Rosado, Póvoa de Varzim, 2001
| critic | record |

SETE CANÇÕES DE ALBANO MARTINS (2000)
for barítone and piano
Duration: 18'
Commissioned by:
First Performance: Paulo Ferreira, Jaime Mota, Porto, 2000
| critic | record |

ESTUDOS E INTERLÚDIOS (2000)
for 6 percussionists
Duration: 25'
Commissioned by:
First Performance: Drumming, dir. Miguel Bernat, Lisboa, 2000
| critic |

TERCEIRO VERSO DE CAEIRO (1997)
for 4 instruments
Duration: 10'
Commissioned by: "Sven for Parlor"
First Performance: "Sven for Parlor", Athens, 1997

NOVE CANÇÕES DE ANTÓNIO RAMOS ROSA (1995)
for voice e piano
Duration: 25'
Commissioned by: Encontros Primavera de Guimarães
First Performance: Rui Taveira, Jaime Mota, Guimarães, 1995
| critic | record |

NOCTURNO/DIURNO (1994)
for string sextet
Duration: 8'
Commissioned by: Câmara Municipal do Porto
First Performance: Sextuor L'Artois de Lille, Porto, 1994
| record |

MONODIA – quasi un requiem (1993)
for string quartet
Duration: 15'
Commissioned by: Câmara Municipal do Porto para as Jornadas de Arte Contemporânea de 1993
http://www.mic.pt/
First Performance: Ensemble MusikFabrik, Porto, 1993
| critic | record 1 | record 2 |

MECHANICAL STRING TOYS (1992)
for string orchestra
(8,6,6,4,4)
Duration: 6'
Commissioned by: Orquestra Metropolitana de Lisboa
First Performance: Orq. Metropolitana de Lisboa,
dir. Miguel Graça Moura, Lisboa, 1992

POETICA DELL ESTINZIONE (secondo mikhal serguieievitch) (1990)
for flute and string quartet
Duration: 6'
Commissioned by: Oficina Musical
First Performance: Oficina Musical,
dir. Álvaro Salazar, Porto, 1990
| record |

CUT (1989 / rev.: 2004)
for saxophone quartet
alto/soprano; alto; tenor; baritone
Duration: 8'
Commissioned by:
First Performance: Quarteto de Saxofones de Lisboa, Lisboa, 1989

GRAVITAÇÕES (1984)
for flute and clarinet
alto/soprano; alto; tenor; baritone
Duration: 6'
Commissioned by: Oficina Musical
First Performance: Eduardo Lucena, Américo Aguiar (Oficina Musical), Porto, 1984
(withdrawn for rev.)

Opera, Oratoria

DE PROFUNDIS (2014)
Choir a cappella
Commissioned by Paulo Lourenço
First performance: May 2014

MAGNIFICAT (2013)
Choir and Orchestra
Commissioned by Culturgest
First performance: Choir and Orchestra Gulbenkian, dir. Cesário Costa, 11/12 Oct. 2013

REQUIEM (2012)
Choir and Orchestra
Duration: 30'
Commissioned by Fundação Calouste Gulbenkian
First performance: Choir and Orchestra Gulbenkian, dir. Joana Carneiro, 21/22 Nov. 2012

OUTRO FIM (2009)
chamber opera
5 singers; fl; ob; cl; Bcl; fg/cf; 2hn; tbn; 2 perc; pf; 3 vl I;3 vl II;2 vla;2 vln;2 cb;
Libreto: José Maria Vieira Mendes
Duration: 1h 30'
Commissioned by: Culturgest
First Performance: Sónia Alcobaça, Luís Rodrigues, Larissa Savchanko, Mário Alves, Madalena Boleo
Orquestra Sinfónica Portuguesa, dir.Cesário Costa,  Lisboa, 2008

A LITTLE MADNESS IN THE SPRING (2006) (withdrawn for rev.)
chamber opera
3 singers; fl; ob; cl; Bcl; fg; tp; hn; tbn; 2 perc; harp; pf; vl I; vl II; vla; vln; cb;
Electronics by Carlos Caires and Antonio Pinho Vargas
Libreto: Paulo Tunhas
Duration: 32'
Commissioned by: Casa da Música
First Performance: Eduarda Melo, Matthew Bean, Ivan Ludlow
Remix Ensemble, dir. Franck Ollu, Lisboa, 1996
| critic |

JUDAS (secundum Lucam, Joannem, Matthaeum et Marcum) (2002)
for choir and orchestra
Large Choir; (2.2.2.2.4.2.2.0. 1 perc); (12.10.8.8.6)
Duration: 30'
Commissioned by: Festival de Música Sacra de Viana do Castelo
First Performance: Choir and Orq. Gulbenkian
dir. Fernando Eldoro, 2002
| critic |

OS DIAS LEVANTADOS (1998)
opera
8 singers; Large Choir; (2.2.3.2 – 2.0.2.2 – 3 perc) ; Strings
Libretto: Manuel Gusmão
Duration: 105'
Commissioned by: Expo'98
First Performance: Orq. Sinfónica Portuguesa, Choir from Teatro Nacional de S. Carlos,
dir. João Paulo Santos, Lisboa, 1998
| critic | record critics | record |

ÉDIPO – Tragédia de Saber (1996)
opera
4 singers; 32 choir; fl;fg; cl; ob; tp; tbn; 2 perc pf; vl I; vl II; vla; vln; cb;
Libretto: Pedro Paixão
Duration: 64'
Commissioned by: Culturgest
First Performance: Soilists from Orq. Sinfónica Portuguesa, Choir from Teatro Nacional de S. Carlos,
dir. João Paulo Santos, Lisboa, 1996

ANCESTRAL E MUDO (1994)
opera
for 4 mixed choir
Duration: 5'
Commissioned by:
First Performance: Coro de Câmara de Lisboa,
dir. Teresita Gutierrez Marques, Lisboa, 1994
| record |

Solo
!Title !!Year !!Instrument !!Duration !!Published by !!Commissioned by !!1st performance

NO ART: four études for solo violin (2012)	
POLÍTICAS DA AMIZADE: ESTUDO PARA VIBRAFONE (2011)
for Vibrafone Solo || 6' || Auditório da Academia de Música de Espinho || Miquel Bernat, 2011

SUITE PARA VIOLONCELO SOLO (2008)	
for Cello Solo || 12' || Conservatório de Música das Caldas de Rainha || Nuno Abreu, Caldas de Rainha, 2008

IL RITORNO (2002) 
for harpsichord ||14' ||International Music Festival of Mafra ||Instituto Camões, 2003 ||Ana Mafalda Castro, Mafra  (withdrawn for rev.)

HOLDERLINOS (2001) 
for piano ||26' ||International Music Festival of Coimbra ||Partituras PortugalSom; www.dgartes.pt ||Miguel Henriques, Coimbra.

LA LUNA (1996) 
for guitar ||3' ||Cecilia Colien Honneger ||Cecilia Colien Honneger Album; https://web.archive.org/web/20080920114718/http://www.editions-ava.com/store/category/88/ ||Gabriel Estrahellas, Madrid.

MIRRORS (1989) 
for piano ||9' ||Secretaria de Estado da Cultura ||Musicoteca, 1994; Portuguese Music Information Centre http://www.mic.pt/ ||Paul Prenen, Amsterdam, 1990.

TRÊS FRAGMENTOS (1985–87)
for clarinet solo ||5' ||Oficina Musical, 1995 ||António Saiote, Lisboa.

PEÇA (1983)
for flute solo ||4' ||Calouste Gulbenkian School of Braga ||-- ||Olavo Tengner, Jorge Salgado, Braga, (withdrawn for rev.).

Film music
Directed by João Botelho
 1988: Tempos difíceis
 1993: Aqui na Terra
 2001: Quem és tu?
Directed by José Fonseca e Costa
 1996: Cinco dias, cinco noites
 2003: O fascínio

References

External links
 Official site
 YouTube

1951 births
Living people
Portuguese composers
Portuguese male composers
Portuguese jazz pianists
People from Vila Nova de Gaia
University of Porto alumni
Pupils of Louis Andriessen
Male pianists
21st-century pianists
21st-century male musicians
Male jazz musicians